Alcathousites is a genus of beetles in the family Cerambycidae, containing the following species:

 Alcathousites asperipennis (Fairmaire & Germain, 1859)
 Alcathousites senticosus Monné & Martins, 1976
 Alcathousites superstes (Erichson, 1847)

References

Acanthocinini